Roger Kempf (6 July 1927 – 9 September 2014) was a French writer, philosopher, Germanist and ethnologist of literature, and emeritus professor at the École polytechnique fédérale de Zurich.

He was awarded several literary prizes, including the Prix Alfred Née of the Académie française in 1969 for his book Sur le corps romanesque, the Prix Ève Delacroix of the Académie française in 2005 for L'indiscrétion des frères Goncourt and the Prix Femina essai in 2004 for the same work.

Publications

Fiction 
Un ami pour la vie, Grasset
Avec André Gide (tale), Grasset

Essai 
Diderot et le roman, Seuil, coll. Pierres Vives
Sur le corps romanesque, Seuil, coll. Pierres Vives
How nice to see you! Americana. Mœurs : ethnologie et fiction, Seuil, coll. Pierre Vives
Dandies : Baudelaire et Cie, Seuil, coll. Pierre Vives
Sur le dandysme (texts presented by Roger Kempf), Union Générale des éditions
Les États-Unis en mouvement (collectif Méditations, n° 1), Denoël/Gonthier
Le Pénis et la démoralisation de l'Occident (with Jean-Paul Aron), Grasset, coll. Figures, 1978
Bouvard, Flaubert et Pécuchet, Grasset
L'indiscrétion des frères Goncourt, Grasset, 2004, Prix Ève-Delacroix of the Académie française, 2005 and Prix Femina essai 2004.

Translation 
Essai pour introduire en philosophie le concept de grandeur négative bty Emmanuel Kant, Vrin
Observations sur le sentiment du beau et du sublime by Emmanuel Kant, Vrin
Controverse avec Eberhard by Emmanuel Kant, Vrin

References

External links 
 Obituary on L'Alsace.fr

20th-century French non-fiction writers
Academic staff of ETH Zurich
German–French translators
Prix Femina essai winners
1927 births
2014 deaths
20th-century translators